The Mahabbat Khel  or Muhabbat Khel or Mohabbat khel or Muhabbat kheyl are Pashtun of Allai. They belonged originally to the Yousufzai tribe, but in Mansehra and Allai the Khel is known as a Swati tribe, because of their invaded from Swat and Afghanistan wardak-kabol.

The Mahabat Khel's forefather's name was Sher Afzal Khan, and he had four sons. Sher Afzal Khan was born between 1500 and 1600 in Swat. The four sons' names were Haleem Shah, Zaman Shah, Bhai Khan and Sida Khan, respectively. Mahabat Khel have a close relationship with the Musa Khel tribe in Allai.
 
Mahabbat Khel are now living in Karachi, Mansehra, Fatehmang Dharyal Chattar Plain and Allai.

Muhabbat Khel is situated in the area of Pakistan. Lies in the northern part of country. Some of the major tourist attractions in the surroundings of the town of Muhabbat Khel are Going patianrowo Nganjuk (Pakistan) about 70 km, Omah, e_yono Palek JAN (Pakistan) about 70 km, JALLOZAI (Pakistan), about 110 km, Taxila (Pakistan) about 155 km, Rohtas Fort (Pakistan) about 201 km, Islāmābād (Pakistan), about 173 km, Buddhist Ruins of Takht-i-Bahi and Neighbouring City Remains at Sahr-i-Bahlol (Pakistan) about 153 km, Question about Chak Sixty Four (Pakistan) about 176 km, Godwar1 (Afghanistan), about 294 km, SAROUNDINGS (Pakistan) about 224 km, Gulmarg Ski (India) about 299 km, Tajbeg Palace (Afghanistan), about 269 km, Bala Hissar (Afghanistan) about 267 km, Kabul (Afghanistan) about 270 km, . If you want to get more information about the surroundings, you will find them on the left below the link Places around. The nearest international airport (DEL) Delhi Indira Gandhi Intl Airport is situated about 732 km from the town of Muhabbat Khel.

Below is the family tree of Mahabat Khel.
The Mahabbat Khel belong to Mandarh Yousufzai - Usman - Amazai- Dolatzai-Mahabat Khel.
http://ro.getamap.net/harti/afghanistan/vardak/_mohabbatkheyl/

Muhabat Khel, Afghanistan Page
Afghanistan:Wilayat-e Wardak

Mohabbatkhel, Mukhabbatkheyl’, Moḩabbat Kheyl, محبت خېل, Muḩabat Khēl, Moḩabbatkhēl, Mukhabbatkheyl', Mohabbat Kheyl

External links
www.khyber.org - The tribe tree of Mandarh
Map of Mahabat Khel

Yusufzai Pashtun tribes